Willard Patterson "Toad" Norman (September 22, 1903 – July 1964) was a professional football player who played in 1928 for the Pottsville Maroons of the National Football League. He was also on the 1929 roster for the Orange Tornadoes. Norman attended and played his college football at Washington & Jefferson College.

See also
 Lists of American football players

Notes
 

1903 births
1964 deaths
People from Braddock, Pennsylvania
Players of American football from Pennsylvania
Orange Tornadoes players
Washington & Jefferson Presidents football players
Pottsville Maroons players
Sportspeople from the Pittsburgh metropolitan area